Asplundia ceci is a species of plant belonging to the family Cyclanthaceae. It occasionally grows terrestrially but is usually a highly branched liana with reddish brown stems of 15 m or longer. Petioles up to 40 cm long bear deeply bifid leaves up to 50 cm long.

This plant has a wide but scattered distribution from Costa Rica to northwestern Colombia. It is found in primary rainforest habitats.

References
New Species of Cyclanthaceae from southern Central America and northern South America

ceci
Flora of Central America
Flora of Colombia
Flora of Costa Rica
Plants described in 2003